Group A of UEFA Euro 2008 was played from 7 to 15 June 2008. All six group matches were played at venues in Switzerland, in Basel and Geneva. The group consisted of co-hosts Switzerland, UEFA Euro 2004 hosts and finalists Portugal, as well as the Czech Republic and Turkey.

Portugal won their first two games against Turkey and the Czech Republic, scoring five goals in the process, to qualify for the quarter-finals as group winners. The second quarter-final berth was to go to the winners of the match between Turkey and the Czech Republic. As the two teams had identical records going into the game, if the match had finished as a draw, the quarter-final place would have been determined by a penalty shoot-out – what would have been the first group stage penalty shoot-out in a major international tournament. Meanwhile, Switzerland became the first team to be eliminated from the tournament after losing to Turkey 2–1 in their second match, Arda Turan scoring a deflected winner in the last minute, having lost 1–0 to the Czech Republic in their opening match. This match between Switzerland and Turkey was dubbed the "Bath of Basel" as the rain poured down incessantly. The weather suited the long-ball Swiss more than the short-passing Turks, and before half time the Swiss had capitalised on the conditions. Indeed, Hakan Yakin's goal stemmed from the ball stopping in a puddle and allowing him an easy finish. In the second half Turkey's more direct style yielded two goals, the second a last-minute long-range shot from Arda Turan which went in off a deflection. This was the first of several last-gasp victories for the Turkish team at the tournament, made all the more impressive by their injury woes at that time.

The final round of matches saw the Portuguese name an under-strength team for their match against Switzerland, their progression already assured. Their opponents, however, fielded a strong side and won the match 2–0, securing their first win in a European Championship. Meanwhile, with a place in the quarter-finals to play for, Turkey and the Czech Republic each had to win to qualify. The Czechs went into half time 1–0 up, and doubled their lead soon after half-time. Arda Turan brought the Turks back into the game in the 75th minute, before Petr Čech made an uncharacteristic error, dropping the ball at the feet of Nihat Kahveci, who was left with a simple finish. Boosted by the equaliser, Turkey went for the win, and two minutes later, Nihat curled the ball past Čech from 20 yards. Then, with just moments left to play, the Turkish goalkeeper Volkan Demirel pushed over the big Czech striker Jan Koller, resulting in a red card for the Turk. With no substitutions left, Turkey had to put Tuncay in goal, but still managed to secure their place in the quarter-finals. Tempers continued to boil over, as Milan Baroš was booked, despite having been on the bench for the whole game.

Teams

Notes

Standings

In the quarter-finals,
The winner of Group A, Portugal, advanced to play the runner-up of Group B, Germany.
The runner-up of Group A, Turkey, advanced to play the winner of Group B, Croatia.

Matches

Switzerland vs Czech Republic

Portugal vs Turkey

Czech Republic vs Portugal

Switzerland vs Turkey

Switzerland vs Portugal

Turkey vs Czech Republic

Notes

References

External links
UEFA Euro 2008 Group A

Group A
Czech Republic at UEFA Euro 2008
Portugal at UEFA Euro 2008
Switzerland at UEFA Euro 2008
Turkey at UEFA Euro 2008